Drummond is a city in Fremont County, Idaho, United States. The population was 16 at the 2010 census. It is part of the Rexburg, Idaho Micropolitan Statistical Area.

Geography
Drummond is located at  (43.999147, -111.343769).

Drummond is east of U.S. Highway 20 on State Highway 32.

Climate
According to the Köppen climate classification, Drummond has a warm-summer humid continental climate (Köppen climate classification: Dfb).

Demographics

2010 census
As of the census of 2010, there were 16 people, 8 households, and 3 families residing in the city. The racial makeup of the city was 93.8% White and 6.3% from two or more races.

There were 8 households, of which 12.5% had children under the age of 18 living with them, 37.5% were married couples living together, and 62.5% were non-families. 50.0% of all households were made up of individuals, and 37.5% had someone living alone who was 65 years of age or older. The average household size was 2.00 and the average family size was 3.33.

The median age in the city was 51.5 years. 18.7% of residents were under the age of 18; 0.1% were between the ages of 18 and 24; 25.1% were from 25 to 44; 18.8% were from 45 to 64; and 37.5% were 65 years of age or older. The gender makeup of the city was 50.0% male and 50.0% female.

2000 census
As of the census of 2000, there were 15 people, 7 households, and 3 families residing in the city. The racial makeup of the city was 100.00% White. Hispanic or Latino of any race were 6.67% of the population.

There were 7 households, out of which none had children under the age of 18 living with them, 28.6% were married couples living together, 14.3% had a female householder with no husband present, and 57.1% were non-families. 42.9% of all households were made up of individuals, and none had someone living alone who was 65 years of age or older. The average household size was 2.14 and the average family size was 3.00.

In the city, the population was spread out, with 6.7% under the age of 18, 20.0% from 18 to 24, 33.3% from 25 to 44, 26.7% from 45 to 64, and 13.3% who were 65 years of age or older. The median age was 42 years. For every 100 females, there were 114.3 males. For every 100 females age 18 and over, there were 133.3 males.

The median income for a household in the city was $12,500, and the median income for a family was $52,917. Males had a median income of $36,250 versus $0 for females. The per capita income for the city was $15,164. There were no families and 35.7% of the population living below the poverty line, including no under eighteens and none of those over 64.

See also
 List of cities in Idaho

References

External links

Cities in Idaho
Cities in Fremont County, Idaho
Rexburg, Idaho micropolitan area